The Albanian Basketball Association (Albanian: Federata Shqiptare e Basketbollit; FSHB) is the governing body of basketball in Albania. The association is based in Tirana, Albania. It organises the national basketball leagues of the Albanian Superliga, the First Division, the Albanian Cup and Supercup. Albania women's national basketball team, Albanian women's basketball league, Albanian Women's Cup and the Albanian Women's Supercup are also overseen. The association also coordinates the activities of the Albania national basketball team and the Albania national youth basketball teams such as, Under-20, Under-18 and Under-16.

History 

By the end of 1945, Albania had no structures or persons in charge to deal directly with the basketball problems. This became possible only when the  Sports Federation was founded in September 1945, when it was created at the technical committee level, dealing with the design of sporting calendar and organizing national activities. They were organized into three sections. One of them was that of sports games, which was part of sportive Inspector Manual, covering, among other things, basketball. With this setup work became possible to have a structure and a person directly in charge of the basketball problems. 

In this way the conditions were met for the creation in 1946 of the Albanian Basketball Federation (FSHB). Now our country had a specialized institution that followed and led the development of the Albanian basketball in the country, but also formally represent our country in foreign relations for basketball, but their connections abroad were still held by the Albanian Sports Federation, which kept ties with federations international. Basketball Federation at that time functioned as a genuine federation, because the missing bodies that such a federation and had the powers it now has. In 1947, only a year after its creation, ASF joined the International Basketball Federation (FIBA). Deserves to highlight the fact that it was one of the 48 federations prior to affiliated national in FIBA since its thememelimi in 1932, 211 such that it has now, which shows that basketball in our country known and played much more see in many other countries.

Organisation 

The Albanian Basketball Association has four main offices which are:

The Albanian Basketball Association is supported by the Albanian Government but is independent from the Ministry of Sports and has a considerable economical autonomy from it. Current chairman of the Albanian Basketball Association is Avni Ponari while members of the Director's Board are:

See also
 Albania national under-20 basketball team

External links 
 Albanian Basketball Association

Basketball
Basketball in Albania
Basketball governing bodies in Europe